The Lehman Interclub, also called the Lehman 10, is an American sailboat that was designed by Barney Lehman as a one design racer and first built in 1958.

Production
The design was initially built by Barney Lehman and then by his company PlastiGlass in the United States, starting in 1948. It was also built by W. D. Schock Corp, starting in 1956, after buying out PlasticGlass, but it is now out of production.

Design
The Lehman Interclub is a racing sailing dinghy, built predominantly of fiberglass, with wood trim. It has a stayed catboat rig, a plumb stem and transom, a transom-hung rudder controlled by a tiller and a retractable daggerboard. It displaces .

Operational history
The design was used for a US-Mexico regatta that was held in Acapulco in February, 1952 and which included sponsorship from the Mexican government.

The August 1963 issue of Motor Boating and Sailing noted that the boat was being "widely used for intercollegiate racing" on the American west coast at that time.

See also
List of sailing boat types

Related development
Lehman 12

Similar sailboats
Interclub Dinghy

References

Dinghies
1950s sailboat type designs
Sailboat type designs by Barney Lehman
Sailboat types built by W. D. Schock Corp
Sailboat types built by PlastiGlass